Ackworth railway station was a railway station serving Ackworth in the English county of West Yorkshire.

History

The station was opened by the Swinton and Knottingley Joint Railway, which became a joint railway between the London, Midland and Scottish Railway and the London and North Eastern Railway during the Grouping of 1923. The station then passed on to the Eastern Region of British Railways on nationalisation in 1948.

The station was then closed by British Railways.

Site today

Trains pass on the Dearne Valley line, but there is no longer a station at Ackworth.

References

Service

External links
 Station on navigable O.S. map

Disused railway stations in Wakefield
Former Swinton and Knottingley Joint Railway stations
Railway stations in Great Britain opened in 1879
Railway stations in Great Britain closed in 1951